John Ecker (born 1948) is a German-American former basketball player and coach.

John or Jon Ecker may also refer to:

Jon-Michael Ecker (born 1983), American actor
Johnny Ecker (born 1973), French football player

See also
John Acker (1870–1933), American businessman and politician
John Eckert (disambiguation)